Vasko Kochev (Bulgarian: Васил Кочев; born 10 August 1988) is a Bulgarian professional footballer who currently plays for Svilengrad 1921 as a midfielder.

Career
Son of Ivan Kochev, notable player of Botev, Vasko began his professional career during the 2008–09 season with Botev Plovdiv.

References

1988 births
Living people
Bulgarian footballers
Botev Plovdiv players
FC Chernomorets Balchik players
First Professional Football League (Bulgaria) players
Footballers from Plovdiv

Association football midfielders